Dušan Lalatović (born 29 November 1998) is a Serbian footballer who plays as a defender for Rad.

Club career
After he spent his youth career with Vojvodina Novi Sad, Lalatović moved to Budućnost Gložan.

Radnički Niš
On 12 February 2018, Lalatović signed with Radnički Niš.
Lalatović made his official debut for Radnički Niš in 26 fixture match of the 2017–18 Serbian SuperLiga season against Javor Ivanjica, played on 7 March 2018, replacing Miloš Petrović in 80 minute.
During the transfer summer of 2018, Lalatović signed a one-season loan deal with Dinamo Vranje.

Radnički Zrenjanin
Ahead of the 2019-20 season, Lalatović joined FK Radnički Zrenjanin.

DAC Dunajská Streda
In January 2020, Lalatović had signed with DAC Dunajská Streda, who were third in the Fortuna Liga table. Lalatović had signed a 1,5 year contract with the club. Lalatović made his debut on 1 March 2020 in an away fixture against Žilina, coming on as a last minute substitute for Andrija Balić.

Career statistics

Club

References

External links
 

1998 births
Footballers from Novi Sad
Living people
Serbian footballers
Association football defenders
FK Radnički Niš players
FK Dinamo Vranje players
PFC Slavia Sofia players
FC DAC 1904 Dunajská Streda players
FK Teleoptik players
FK Rad players
Serbian SuperLiga players
Slovak Super Liga players
Serbian First League players
Serbian expatriate footballers
Serbian expatriate sportspeople in Bulgaria
Serbian expatriate sportspeople in Slovakia
Expatriate footballers in Bulgaria
Expatriate footballers in Slovakia